Clay Christiansen  is an American organist who previously played for the Salt Lake Tabernacle organ and the Mormon Tabernacle Choir. He accompanied the Choir in Salt Lake City and when it was on tour. Christiansen gave organ recitals in the Salt Lake Tabernacle and the Conference Center.

Christiansen had a fascination with music from an early age. He was born in the small city of Emery, Utah, in 1949. He would play on the piano for hours on end. When neighbor children would come to play he would rather stay in and practice the piano. He played his first piano solo, "We Thank Thee, O God, for a Prophet", in church at the age of six. He played by ear until the age of eight when he took his first piano lessons. He was the accompanist for his church Sunday School and Priesthood services and a substitute ward organist at the age of eleven.

Christiansen has a bachelor's degree from Brigham Young University and masters and Ph.D. in Music Composition from the University of Utah (1988).

From 1972 to 1982 Christiansen was the organist for St. Mark's Episcopal Cathedral in Salt Lake City.  Christiansen was also organist at Congregation Kol Ami, a Jewish synagogue in Salt Lake City. From 1982 to 2018 he had been one of the Tabernacle Organists.

Christiansen and his wife, Diane, are the parents of 13 children.

Christiansen is also a composer. He wrote the music to the hymn "In Fasting We Approach Thee". He has written a broad variety of choral, piano and organ compositions and transcriptions. His works appear in the catalogs of MorningStar Music Publishers, Shawnee Press, Jackman Music Press and SDG Press.

References 

 
 

1949 births
Tabernacle Choir organists
American Latter Day Saint hymnwriters
Brigham Young University alumni
University of Utah alumni
Living people
American classical organists
American male organists
People from Emery County, Utah
Synagogue organists
Latter Day Saints from Utah
21st-century organists
21st-century American keyboardists
Male classical organists